Little Bird(s) may refer to:

Film and television 
 Little Bird (film), a 1997 Spanish drama film
 Little Birds (film), a 2011 American film by Elgin James
 Little Bird (TV series), a 2021–2022 Canadian drama series
 Little Birds (TV series), a 2020 British series based on stories by Anaïs Nin (see below)
 Little Bird, a character from Sesame Street

Literature 
 Little Birds (short story collection), a 1979 book by Anaïs Nin
 Little Bird, a 2008 novel by Camilla Way
Little Bird, a 2019 comic book mini-series by Ian Bertram and Darcy Van Poelgeest

Music

Albums 
 Little Bird (Kasey Chambers album) or the title song, 2010
 Little Bird (Misty Edwards album) or the title song, 2014
 Little Bird, by Pete Jolly, or the title song, 1963

Songs 
 "Little Bird" (Annie Lennox song), 1993
 "Little Bird" (Beach Boys song), 1968
 "Little Bird", by the Beau Brummels from Bradley's Barn, 1968
 "Little Bird", by Cass Fox from Come Here, 2005
 "Little Bird", by Dr. Dog from Passed Away, Vol. 1, 2008
 "Little Bird", by Ed Sheeran from +, 2011
 "Little Bird", by Eels from End Times, 2010
 "Little Bird", by Far East Movement from Dirty Bass, 2012
 "Little Bird", by Goldfrapp from Seventh Tree, 2008
 "Little Bird", by Imogen Heap from Ellipse, 2009
 "Little Bird", by Lisa Hannigan from Passenger, 2011
 "Little Bird", by the White Stripes from De Stijl, 2000
 "Little Birds", by Neutral Milk Hotel, 2011
 "Little Bird", by the Ghost of Paul Revere

Other uses 
 Little Bird Bistro, a defunct French bistro in Portland, Oregon, US
 Jimmy Heath (1926–2020), nicknamed "Little Bird", American jazz saxophonist
 MD Helicopters MH-6 Little Bird, an American military helicopter